Andrew Panazzolo (born 23 January 1979)  is a Paralympic cycling competitor from  Australia. He was born in Adelaide, South Australia.   He won a bronze medal at the 2004 Athens Games in the Men's Individual Pursuit Bicycle CP Div 3 event and a silver medal in the Men's 1 km Time Trial Bicycle CP Div 3/4 event.

References

Paralympic cyclists of Australia
Cyclists at the 2004 Summer Paralympics
Paralympic bronze medalists for Australia
Paralympic silver medalists for Australia
Living people
Medalists at the 2004 Summer Paralympics
1979 births
Australian male cyclists
Paralympic medalists in cycling